The Poluy is a river in Yamalo-Nenets Autonomous Okrug, Russia, a right tributary of the Ob. It flows into the Ob near the city Salekhard.

References

Rivers of Yamalo-Nenets Autonomous Okrug